The fourteenth season of Saturday Night Live, an American sketch comedy series, originally aired in the United States on NBC between October 8, 1988 and May 20, 1989.

A new show logo was used starting with this season. It was made up of the words SATURDAY + NIGHT + LIVE styled in a circle. It was used until the end of the show's 20th season in 1995.

This season notably saw the death of a second original cast member, Gilda Radner, who died on the day of the season finale from ovarian cancer. In memory of Radner, Steve Martin showed a clip from the "Dancing in the Dark" sketch from the 1978 episode hosted by Martin in lieu of his planned monologue.

This season introduced the "Wayne's World" skits.

Cast
Before the start of the season, no changes were made to the cast. Al Franken, having rejoined the show as a writer and occasional on-screen performer three years ago, was once again credited as a featured cast member. As the season progressed, Lorne Michaels would hire two new people to the cast: Mike Myers and Ben Stiller, who joined the show mid-season as featured players. Stiller had actually appeared on the show before; his film made it onto the show in the episode hosted by Charlton Heston in 1987. This was the only season of the show for Stiller. After being on the show for four episodes, Stiller left due to creative differences with Michaels.

Cast roster

Repertory players
Dana Carvey
Nora Dunn
Phil Hartman
Jan Hooks
Victoria Jackson
Jon Lovitz
Dennis Miller
Kevin Nealon

Featured players
A. Whitney Brown
Al Franken
Mike Myers (first episode: January 21, 1989)
Ben Stiller (first episode: March 25, 1989 / last episode: April 22, 1989)

bold denotes Weekend Update anchor

Writers

Episodes

References

14
1988 American television seasons
1989 American television seasons
Saturday Night Live in the 1980s